Gainsborough is a constituency in Lincolnshire represented in the House of Commons of the UK Parliament since 1983 by Sir Edward Leigh, a Conservative.

History
The constituency was created under the Redistribution of Seats Act 1885 that year, which lasted until it was reformed as Gainsborough and Horncastle on a boundary change for the 1983 election. That seat lasted until 1997, as from the mid-1990s population changes led to removal of Horncastle from the seat and recreation of the old seat with largely similar boundaries.

Boundaries 

1885–1918: The Municipal Borough of Lincoln, the Sessional Divisions of Epworth, Gainsborough, Lincoln, and the parish of Bracebridge.

1918–1950: The Urban Districts of Crowle and Gainsborough, and the Rural Districts of Gainsborough, Isle of Axholme, and Welton.

1950–1983: The Urban Districts of Gainsborough and Market Rasen, and the Rural Districts of Caistor, Gainsborough, Isle of Axholme, and Welton.

1997–2010: The District of West Lindsey, and the District of East Lindsey wards of Binbrook and Wragby.

2010–present: The District of West Lindsey, and the District of East Lindsey ward of Wragby.

This constituency is named for its largest town of Gainsborough, on the west edge of the constituency, and comprises the West Lindsey district, and the Wragby ward of the East Lindsey district.

Constituency profile 
This relatively vast rural seat north of Lincoln is named after the small market town at its western boundary. Regeneration projects are attempting to reduce pockets of severe deprivation in the constituency, but most of the area is affluent, albeit remote from many major cities; the closest conurbation is the city of Lincoln to the immediate south. Scunthorpe and Grimsby are both close enough to the northern edge of the constituency to be significant to residents. Though arable farming dominates the landscape and noteworthy pig farming industry (see Lincolnshire sausages), agriculture is in decline and the service/creative sector dominates. The seat has elected Conservative MPs since 1924 and is a stronghold, as well as giving its MPs very long tenures, having been represented by only three people since 1924.

Members of Parliament

Elections

Elections in the 2010s

Elections in the 2000s

Elections in the 1990s

Election results following boundary changes
For 1983 - 1992, see Gainsborough and Horncastle (UK Parliament constituency)

Elections in the 1970s

Elections in the 1960s

Elections in the 1950s

Election in the 1940s

General Election 1939–40:

Another general election was required to take place before the end of 1940. The political parties had been making preparations for an election to take place from 1939 and by the end of this year, the following candidates had been selected; 
Conservative: Harry Crookshank, 
Liberal: Margaret Wintringham

Election in the 1930s

Elections in the 1920s

Elections in the 1910s

Election results 1885-1918

Elections in the 1880s

Elections in the 1890s

Elections in the 1900s

Elections in the 1910s

General Election 1914–15:

Another General Election was required to take place before the end of 1915. The political parties had been making preparations for an election to take place and by July 1914, the following candidates had been selected; 
Liberal: George Jackson Bentham
Unionist: John Molson

See also 
 List of parliamentary constituencies in Lincolnshire
 The town of Gainsborough, Lincolnshire

Notes

References

Sources 

Parliamentary constituencies in Lincolnshire
Constituencies of the Parliament of the United Kingdom established in 1885